The counter-jihad movement in France consists of various organisations and individuals such as Riposte Laïque and Résistance Républicaine, led by Pierre Cassen and Christine Tasin respectively, Observatoire de l'Islamisation, and other groups such as those founded by Alain Wagner. The movement has cooperated with the Bloc Identitaire, Daniel Pipes and the Middle East Forum, Stop Islamisation of Europe, and has organised events such as the "Apéro Géant: saucisson et pinard", a happy hour gathering of wine and deli meat cold cuts whose ingredients include pork.

Riposte Laïque
Riposte Laïque ("Secular Retaliation" or "Secular Counter-attack ") was founded by Pierre Cassen (born 1953) in 2007. Cassen describes himself as an old Trotskyist, and his aim was to create a new web-based journal as a forum for the defence of secularism, particularly against the threat from Islam. Although Cassen still identifies as a leftist and says the journal has a staff from a variety of political backgrounds, it is often portrayed as far-right. It is very active publishing articles, videos on YouTube, and has a strong presence on social media. The group has faced an "overwhelming" number of lawsuits.

Résistance Républicaine

The Résistance Républicaine was founded in 2010 by Christine Tasin (born 24 January 1955). Tasin is an atheist and comes from a politically leftist background. She had previously collaborated with Riposte Laïque, and is in a relationship with its founder Pierre Cassen. In contrast to Riposte Laïque, the group functions more as a grassroots movement, although it also has an online presence. Tasin has been sentenced for inciting hatred against Muslims, and when she appealed her verdict, which she won, her legal costs were covered by the American Middle East Forum.

Observatoire de l'Islamisation
The Observatoire de l'Islamisation and the Observatoire du halal are counter-jihad websites founded by Joachim Véliocas (born 1981) in 2007. He is an independent researcher who in 2006 published the first comprehensive study on the "Islamisation of France" in L'islamisation de la France, which analyzed Muslim associations and all the Islamist tendencies developing in France. In 2010 he published his second essay, Ces Maires qui courtisent l'islamisme, which deals with the relations between politicians and Islamist associations, in particular the public funding that the latter obtain through electoral clientelism. He has later published three more books, respectively about radical mosques, the Muslim Brotherhood, and the church in the face of Islam.

Alain Wagner
Jean-Michel Clément, better known as Alain Wagner, is a French counter-jihad activist who has been linked to several counter-jihad groups, including as the founder of L’Alliance FFL ("Alliance to Stop Sharia") and Vérité, Valeurs et Démocratie ("Truth, Values and Democracy") and as leader of Union de Défense des Citoyens et Contribuables.

Wagner became leader of the International Civil Liberties Alliance in 2012, making him "one of the most important figures in the European counter-jihadist scene". Before that, he was involved with the European Freedom Initiative group. He has attended several meetings and conferences of the Organization for Security and Cooperation in Europe (OSCE). He has also participated in rallies in support of Tommy Robinson, and international counter-jihad conferences. He has cooperated with both Riposte Laïque and Résistance Républicaine.

References

Anti-Islam sentiment in France
France
Far-right politics in France